The 2016 West Lancashire Borough Council election take place on 5 May 2016 to elect members of  West Lancashire Borough Council in Lancashire, England. Following the 2015 local elections Labour Party (UK) took control of the council. A third of the seats were being polled during this election. Summary post election-

Political Composition after election: Conservative (Leader Councillor David Westley) 22 seats; Labour (Leader Councillor Ian Moran) 31 seats and Our West Lancashire 1 seat.

By ward

Ashurst

Aughton and Downholland

Birch Green

Burscough East

Burscough West

Derby

Digmoor

Halsall

Hesketh-with-Becconsall

Knowsley

Moorside

Rufford

Scott

Skelmersdale North

Skelmersdale South

Tarleton

Up Holland

Wrightington

References

2016 English local elections
2016
2010s in Lancashire